The Virginia Slims of St. Louis is a defunct WTA Tour affiliated tennis tournament played in 1973. It was held in St. Louis, Missouri in the United States and played on outdoor hard courts.

Past finals

Singles

Doubles

External links
 WTA Results Archive

Defunct tennis tournaments in the United States
Hard court tennis tournaments in the United States
WTA Tour
Virginia Slims tennis tournaments
History of women in Missouri